William Craig (May 16, 1828 – January 1, 1897) was an Ontario political figure. He represented Russell in the Legislative Assembly of Ontario as a Conservative member from 1867 to 1874.

He was born in Bytown in 1828, the son of an Irish immigrant, and educated in Nepean. He served as warden for the counties of Prescott and Russell and reeve for Russell Township. He died in Russell in 1897.

References

External links 

The Canadian parliamentary companion and annual register, 1873, HJ Morgan

1828 births
1897 deaths
People from Russell, Ontario
Politicians from Ottawa
Progressive Conservative Party of Ontario MPPs